The Church of St. Francis Xavier (St. Francis for short) is a Roman Catholic church in Benson, Minnesota, United States.  The parish was founded in 1881 and its current building was designed by architect Emmanuel Louis Masqueray and constructed in 1917.  St. Francis's building was listed on the National Register of Historic Places in 1985 for having local significance in the themes of architecture and European ethnic heritage.  It was nominated for being one of west-central Minnesota's most architecturally sophisticated churches, for its Renaissance Revival design by Masqueray, and for its association with a parish of Swift County's late-19th-century Catholic settlers.

The parish is now part of St. Isidore the Farmer Area Faith Community, which also includes St. John in Appleton, St. Malachy in Clontarf, St. Bridget in De Graff, Sacred Heart in Murdock, and Visitation Oratory in Danvers.

See also
 List of Catholic churches in the United States
 National Register of Historic Places listings in Swift County, Minnesota

References

External links
 St. Isidore the Farmer Area Faith Community

1881 establishments in Minnesota
Benson, Minnesota
Churches in Swift County, Minnesota
Churches in the Roman Catholic Diocese of New Ulm
National Register of Historic Places in Swift County, Minnesota
Renaissance Revival architecture in Minnesota
Roman Catholic churches completed in 1917
Churches on the National Register of Historic Places in Minnesota
20th-century Roman Catholic church buildings in the United States